Ricardo Vidal (9 October 1930 – 10 March 2010) was a Chilean long-distance runner. He competed in the marathon at the 1964 Summer Olympics.

References

External links
 
 

1930 births
2010 deaths
Athletes (track and field) at the 1959 Pan American Games
Athletes (track and field) at the 1963 Pan American Games
Athletes (track and field) at the 1964 Summer Olympics
Chilean male long-distance runners
Chilean male marathon runners
Olympic athletes of Chile
Place of birth missing
Pan American Games competitors for Chile